Statistics of the USFSA Football Championship in the 1905 season.

Tournament

First round
 FC Nice 3-5 Olympique de Marseille

Second round 
 Olympique de Marseille - FC Lyon 
 Stade Olympien des Étudiants Toulousains - Stade bordelais (Stade bordleais forfeited)
Union sportive Servannaise 4-1 Association Sportive de Trouville-Deauville
 Sport Athlétique Sézannais - Cercle Sportif du Stade Lorrain (CSSL forfeited)

Quarterfinals 
 Gallia Club Paris 3-1 Union sportive Servannaise
 Le Havre AC 1-2 RC Roubaix 
 Stade Olympique des Étudiants Toulousains 5-0 Olympique de Marseille
 Amiens AC - Sport Athlétique Sézannais (Sezanne forfeited)

Semifinals 
 Stade Olympique des Étudiants Toulousains 0-5 Gallia Club Paris
 RC Roubaix 5-1 Amiens AC

Final 
 Gallia Club Paris 1-0  RC Roubaix

References
RSSF

USFSA Football Championship
1
France